Mund is a Brahmin Community in Western Odisha, India.

 Mund is a commune in Valais, Switzerland.

Mund may also refer to: 
a German surname
Uwe Mund (conductor)
Arthur Mund, a diver in the 1928 Olympics 
Günther Mund, a diver in the 1948 and 1956 Olympics
Werner Mund, fencer
Uwe Mund (rower) in the 1988 Olympics
 Johannes Ludwig Leopold Mund, naturalist: see Mund and Maire
 Pros Mund, Danish admiral in the 17th century
 Mund (in law), a concept of the role of "protector" in Germanic law and early feudalism
 Mundu, an Indian garment
A village or settlement in Toda society
Mund, Gujrat, a village in Pakistan